Nugzar (Nukri) Kakilashvili (born 28 May 1960 in Tbilisi) is a retired Georgian and Soviet football player. 

He participated in 1981 European Cup Winners' Cup Final, in which Dinamo Tbilisi won its first and only continental title.

Honours
 Soviet Top League winner: 1978.
 Soviet Cup winner: 1979.
 UEFA Cup Winners' Cup winner: 1981.

References

External links
  Footballfacts Profile
  Ministry of Sport and Youth Affairs of Georgia Profile

1960 births
Soviet footballers
Footballers from Georgia (country)
Association football wingers
FC Dinamo Tbilisi players
Soviet Top League players
Living people
Footballers from Tbilisi